Veltheimia bracteata is a species of plant. It belongs to the genus Veltheimia, which contains only one other species, Velthemia capensis. Veltheimia bracteata is commonly referred to as the forest lily, sand onion, or red hot poker (though the term “red hot poker” is also applied to species in the genus Kniphofia). This pendent shaped plant ranges in color from a yellowish pink to red. It is a winter flowering perennial plant, so is in full bloom when other flowers have withered away. Plants grow to be  in height.

Description
Veltheimia bracteata is a bulbous plant with glossy leaves. The flower stems arise from a rosette of basal leaves and blossom in an inflorescence arrangement which is typically surrounded by dense spikes. Plants are pollinated by birds. A fleshy seed is then produced at the end of August.

Distribution
Veltheimia bracteata is native to the south-eastern Cape Provinces of South Africa.

Cultivation
V. bracteata is generally planted in early fall and is in full bloom till spring time. These plants have become popular in people's gardens because they do not need much and they add beauty to a winter garden. They grow in the shade, without much water, and can prosper in low temperatures. They are used to decorate houses, walkways and public facilities to bring a tropical feel.  Winter hardy in USDA zones 9-10.

In cultivation in the UK It has gained the Royal Horticultural Society’s Award of Garden Merit. 

V. bracteata and V. capensis can interbreed and produce hybrids.

See also

 List of plants known as lily

References

Scilloideae
Flora of the Cape Provinces
Plants described in 1870
Taxa named by John Gilbert Baker
Taxa named by William Henry Harvey